Lu Xun Academy of Fine Arts or LAFA is an art school in Shenyang, Liaoning Province, China.

Introduction
Established in 1938, Luxun Academy of Fine Art (LAFA) is founded and primarily focusing on education of talents in painting, sculpture and photography, as well as fashion garment, industrial product design and environmental architect. With its campus located in Shenyang, a prime metropolitan city in north east of China, LAFA has its second campus established at a beach side area in the municipal of Dalian, a harbor city in the same province of LAFA’s main campus.
With a history of 70 years, LAFA is well recognized as one of the top-three art academy in China, along with the Academy of Arts and Design at Tsinghua University and China Central Academy of Fine Arts. 
The campus added up to an area of 464181square meters. The library covers 365000 books, and also more than 3000 pieces of authentic paintings and calligraphies. The Art Gallery covers an architectural area of 4340 square meters.
There are 395 faculty members, among which there are 44 professors, 112 associate professors, along with a group of experts from foreign countries. 
Art works by teachers and fellows are collected by National Art Museum of China, the Historical Museum of China, and the Chinese Military Museum. 
LAFA’s art talents are welcomed by society. More than 13000 talents playing key role at various positions since 1958, among whom many have become famous artists and outstanding professionals. As of 2011, there are 4718 students of different levels in the academy, among whom there are 3475 undergraduates of M.F.A. and 42 foreign students.

History
The school was founded in 1938 as Luxun Academy of Arts by Communist Party of China leaders, including Mao Zedong and Zhou Enlai, in the town of Yan'an, Shaanxi Province. The school was moved to Shenyang in 1940, span off its music department in 1953 (which later became Shenyang Conservatory of Music) and was renamed Lu Xun Academy of Fine Arts in 1958.

The composers of the original Lu Xun Academy in Yan'an and Shenyang include Ma Ke (composer) who composed the opera The White-Haired Girl, Chen Zi composer of the 1954 Liu Hulan (opera) and others.

Departments of the Academy
Chinese Painting Department, Printmaking Department, Oil Painting Department, Sculpture Department, Photography Department, Visual Communication Art Design Department, Environmental Art Design Department, Textile and Fashion Design Department, Industrial Design Department, History of Art Department, Cultural Communication and Management Department, and an Art Culture Studying Center (Chinese Figure Painting Studio).
Education in 21 specialties: Chinese Painting, Calligraphy, Printmaking, Watercolor, Oil Painting, Sculpture, Photography, Film Photography, Graphic Design, Decorative Art Design, Multimedia Art Design, Animation Design, Environmental Art Design, Urban Landscape Design, Textile Art Design, Fashion Design, Fiber Art Design, Industrial Design, Ceramic Art Design, History of Art, Cultural Communication and Management. 
Dalian Campus offers 16 professional studios: Graphic Design, Multimedia Design, Decorative Art Design, Exhibit Design, Advertisement Design, Packing Design, Book Design, Illustration Design, Commercial Photography, Ceramic Art, Two-dimension Design, Three-dimension Design, UI interface Design, Development Design of Animation Products Series, Interactive Web Design, and Virtual Reality Games Design.

Campus
The Lu Xun Academy of Fine Arts has two campuses: Shenyang Campus in downtown Shenyang, and Dalian Campus in Jinshitan, Dalian.

Alumni 

 Jia Aili
 Wang Bing
 Lin Fei Fei
 Luo Yang
 Wanxin Zhang

References

External links
Lu Xun Academy of Fine Arts

Educational institutions established in 1938
Universities and colleges in Shenyang
Arts organizations established in 1938
Lu Xun
1938 establishments in China